The 2011 BSL All-Star Game was an exhibition basketball game that was played on 11 January 2011 at Gan Ner Sports Hall, home of Hapoel Gilboa Galil. The game was played during the 2010–11 BSL Season.

All-Star Game
The BSL League Administration announced the re-establishment of the BSL All-Star Game On 8 December 2010. The rosters for the All-Star Game were chosen by an online voting, In which the fans choose one international player and one local player from each team.
The voting was open for three weeks, until 27 December. After counting approximately 10,000 votes the following rosters has been chosen.

Roster

Game

Lior Eliyahu was named MVP of the match as he scored 27 points and passed 13 assists.

Three-point shootout

Slam Dunk Contest

References 

All Star